Dale Milford (February 18, 1926 – December 26, 1997) was a U.S. Representative from Texas.

He was born in Bug Tussle, Texas, and attended its public schools, then Baylor University in Waco from 1953 to 1957. He served in the United States Army from 1944 to 1953, attaining the rank of captain. Milford was a consultant in aviation and meteorology prior to going to Congress and operated a commercial flight service as well, until 1958. From 1953-58, Milford was a staff meteorologist for KWTX-TV in Waco, then moved into the major markets in the same capacity at WFAA-TV from 1958-71. He was a delegate to the Texas State Democratic convention of 1972.

Milford was elected as a Democrat to the Ninety-third, Ninety-fourth and Ninety-fifth Congresses (January 3, 1973 – January 3, 1979). He was an unsuccessful candidate for renomination in 1978 to the Ninety-sixth Congress. He was a resident of Howe, Texas, until his death there on December 26, 1997. He was interred at Dial Cemetery in Honey Grove, Texas.

Sources

External links 
 

1926 births
1997 deaths
American television meteorologists
Aviators from Texas
United States Army officers
Democratic Party members of the United States House of Representatives from Texas
20th-century American politicians
People from Fannin County, Texas
People from Grayson County, Texas
Military personnel from Texas